In molecular biology, Small nucleolar RNA SNORD60 (also known as U60) is a non-coding RNA that belongs to the C/D class of small nucleolar RNA (snoRNA).  Most of the members of the box C/D family function in directing site-specific 2'-O-methylation of substrate RNAs.

References

External links 
 
 

Small nuclear RNA